The Buckle Up in Your Truck 225 presented by Click It or Ticket was a  annual race NASCAR Gander RV & Outdoors Truck Series race held at Kentucky Speedway in Sparta, Kentucky. Kentucky received a second date beginning in 2011 as part of NASCAR's latest round of schedule realignment; since 2000 the track had always held a Truck Series event.

History
In the inaugural UNOH 225, which was held on July 7, 2011, Johnny Sauter won the pole position, but Kyle Busch won the race during a green-white-checkered finish. Busch started in the last position after missing the drivers meeting held earlier that day.

The race was removed from the NASCAR schedule in 2021. The final race in 2020 was shortened by lightning and won by Sheldon Creed; it was the eventual Truck champion's first career series win.

Past winners

2011: This race was extended due to a NASCAR Overtime finish.
2015: The race was shortened due to damage to the catchfence from Ben Kennedy's wreck.
2017: Race started Thursday but ended shortly after midnight Friday due to a rain delay.
2020: Race moved from July 9 to July 11 due to schedule changes resulting from the COVID-19 pandemic. The race was shortened due to rain/lightning after the completion of Stage 2 at lap 70.

Multiple winners (drivers)

Multiple winners (teams)

Manufacturer wins

References

External links
 

Former NASCAR races
NASCAR Truck Series races
 
2011 establishments in Kentucky
Recurring sporting events established in 2011
July sporting events
Recurring sporting events disestablished in 2020